The Elephant Falls are a two-tier waterfall in Shillong, Meghalaya, India. The mountain stream descends through two successive falls set in dells of fern-covered rocks.

History 
The original Khasi name for the falls is Ka Kshaid Lai Pateng Khohsiew, which translates to "the three - step waterfall". This name is still used locally. However the modern name is explained by a signboard near the waterfall. The name originated in the British era when the Englishmen spotted a giant rock that looked like an elephant near the fall. This rock was destroyed in the 1897 due to an earthquake.

Description 
The first fall of Elephant Falls is an example of a horsetail-punchbowl waterfall. The first fall is very broad and is hidden among trees. The second fall however, is quite domesticated and in the winters (and drier months) looks inconsequential. The third fall is the tallest and comes to view suddenly and looks most spectacular with crystal clear water falling over sharp rocks of myriad shapes.

The sides of the waterfall are flanked by lush greenery and are rich in ferns.

Location 
Elephant Falls is situated at the outskirts of the main city of Shillong in the East Khasi Hills District, Upper Shillong. It is almost 12 km away from the Shillong city center.

A small signboard quite near the Shillong Peak, marks a small road that turns off to the edge of the mountain. This road leads to the falls.

From the gate, there is a steep, slippery flight of stairs to navigate each level of the fall with the first and second level facilitated with benches to rest and relax.

A ticket costing 20 INR is required to view the fall with an additional charge of 20 INR for permission to bring the camera.

Gallery

References

Waterfalls of Meghalaya
Geography of Meghalaya
Tourist attractions in Meghalaya
Shillong